The Modified 1719 Establishment Group of sixth rates were basically identical to the 1719 Establishment Group except the were two feet wider. One ship would be a rebuild of an earlier vessel and one vessel of new construction. These vessels like the 1719 Establishment Group would have no lower gun ports, however, would have ten oar ports per side on the lower deck. These ships would be constructed between 1729 and 1732.

Design and specifications
The construction of the vessels was assigned to Deptford Dockyard under the guidance of Master Shipwright Richard Stacey. As with most vessels of this time period only order and launch dates are available. The dimensional data listed here is the specification data. The tonnage calculation would be 428 tons.

The gun armament as established in 1703 would be twenty 6-pounder 19 hundredweight (cwt) guns mounted on wooden trucks on the upper deck (UD).

Ships of the 1719 Establishment Group

Citations

References
 Winfield 2009, British Warships in the Age of Sail (1603 – 1714), by Rif Winfield, published by Seaforth Publishing, England © 2009, EPUB , Chapter 5, The Fifth Rates, Vessels acquired from 16 December 1688, Fifth Rates of 32 and 36 guns, 1689 Programme
 Winfield 2007, British Warships in the Age of Sail (1714 – 1792), by Rif Winfield, published by Seaforth Publishing, England © 2007, EPUB , Chapter 6, Sixth Rates, Sixth Rates of 20 or 24 guns, Vessels Acquired from 1 August 1714, Modified 1719 Establishment Group
 Colledge, Ships of the Royal Navy, by J.J. Colledge, revised and updated by Lt Cdr Ben Warlow and Steve Bush, published by Seaforth Publishing, Barnsley, Great Britain, © 2020, EPUB 

 

Corvettes of the Royal Navy
Ships of the Royal Navy